Siskiyou may refer to:
Siskiyou Mountains, a mountain range in northern California and southern Oregon
Siskiyou National Forest, in Oregon and California
Siskiyou County, California
Siskiyou Trail, an old Native American and pioneer trail connecting Oregon and California
Siskiyou Summit, a mountain pass (4,037 ft/1,230 m) on Interstate 5 in southern Oregon
Siskiyou Mountains salamander
Siskiyou (newspaper), a student-run newspaper at Southern Oregon University in Ashland, Oregon.
Siskiyou (band), a Canadian indie folk band.